Vladimir "Lado" Akhalaia (born 26 June 1982) is a Georgian former footballer who played as a striker.

Career
Akhalaia left FC Dinamo Tbilisi on loan for FC Zürich in 2005.

International career
Akhalaia capped once for Georgia in 2004 against Romania.

References

External links
 
 

1982 births
Living people
Footballers from Georgia (country)
Expatriate footballers from Georgia (country)
Georgia (country) international footballers
Esteghlal F.C. players
FC Merani Tbilisi players
FC Zimbru Chișinău players
FC Rapid Ghidighici players
FC Dinamo Tbilisi players
FC Zürich players
Swiss Super League players
FC Dacia Chișinău players
FC Sioni Bolnisi players
CSF Bălți players
FC Meskheti Akhaltsikhe players
FC Zugdidi players
FC Metalurgi Rustavi players
Expatriate footballers in Moldova
Expatriate footballers in Switzerland
Expatriate sportspeople from Georgia (country) in Moldova
Expatriate sportspeople from Georgia (country) in Switzerland
Association football forwards